Magic Quadrant (MQ) is a series of market research reports published by IT consulting firm Gartner that rely on proprietary qualitative data analysis methods to demonstrate market trends, such as direction, maturity and participants. Their analyses are conducted for several specific technology industries and are updated every 1–2 years: once an updated report has been published its predecessor is "retired".

Rating
Gartner rates vendors upon two criteria: completeness of vision and ability to execute.

 Completeness of Vision
 Reflects the vendor’s innovation, and whether the vendor drives or follows the market.
 Ability to Execute
 Summarizes factors such as the vendor’s financial viability, market responsiveness, product development, sales channels and customer base.

These component scores lead to a vendor position in one of four quadrants:

 Leaders
 Vendors in the Leaders quadrant have the highest composite scores for their Completeness of Vision and Ability to Execute. A vendor in the Leaders quadrant has the market share, credibility, and marketing & sales capabilities needed to drive the acceptance of new technologies. These vendors demonstrate a clear understanding of market needs, they are innovators and thought leaders, and they have well-articulated plans that customers and prospects can use when designing their infrastructures and strategies. In addition, they have a presence in the five major geographical regions, consistent financial performance, and broad platform support.
 Challengers
 A vendor in the Challengers quadrant participates in the market and executes well enough to be a serious threat to vendors in the Leaders quadrant. They have strong products, as well as sufficiently credible market position and resources to sustain continued growth. Financial viability is not an issue for vendors in the Challengers quadrant, but they lack the size and influence of vendors in the Leaders quadrant.
 Visionaries
 A vendor in the Visionaries quadrant delivers innovative products that address operationally or financially important end-user problems at a broad scale, but has not yet demonstrated the ability to capture market share or sustainable profitability. Visionary vendors are frequently privately held companies and acquisition targets for larger, established companies. The likelihood of acquisition often reduces the risks associated with installing their systems.
 Niche Players
 Vendors in the Niche Players quadrant are often narrowly focused on specific market or vertical segments. This quadrant may also include vendors that are adapting their existing products to enter the market under consideration, or larger vendors having difficulty developing and executing on their vision.

Gartner Critical Capabilities complement Magic Quadrant analysis to offer deeper insight into the products and services offered by multiple vendors by a comparative analysis that scores competing products or services against a set of critical differentiators identified by Gartner.

Criticism

The Magic Quadrant, and analysts in general, also skew the market: according to research, by applying their methodologies to describe a market, they change that marketplace to fit their tools.

Another criticism is that open source vendors are not considered sufficiently by analysts like Gartner, as has been published in an online discussion between a VP from Talend and a German Research VP from Gartner.

Gartner was the target of a federal lawsuit (filed May 29, 2009) from software vendor ZL Technologies challenging the “legitimacy” of Gartner's Magic Quadrant rating system. Gartner filed a motion to dismiss by claiming First Amendment protection since it contends that its MQ reports contain "pure opinion", which legally means opinions which are not based on fact. The court threw out the ZL case because it lacked a specific complaint. That decision was upheld on appeal.

See also
 Hype cycle
 Product-Market Growth Matrix

References

External links
 Gartner Magic Quadrant
 An alphabetical list of the latest Magic Quadrant documents

Research
Methodology
Information science